David Harris Ebenbach (born April 19, 1972) is a U.S. writer of fiction and poetry, a teacher, and an editor. He is the author of nine books, and he is the recipient of the Drue Heinz Literature Prize, the Juniper Prize and the Patricia Bibby Award.

Ebenbach's first science fiction novel, How to Mars, was published in 2021.

Life
Ebenbach was born and raised in Philadelphia. 
He graduated from the University of Wisconsin–Madison with a Ph.D. in Psychology, and from Vermont College with an MFA.
He was a visiting professor at Earlham College, living in Ohio.  
He currently teaches creative writing at Georgetown University, where he works in the Center for Jewish Civilization, and promotes student-centered teaching at the Center for New Designs in Learning and Scholarship.

Awards
 Juniper Prize for Fiction, for The Guy We Didn't Invite To The Orgy
 Patricia Bibby Award, for We Were The People Who Moved 
 Washington Writers’ Publishing House Fiction Prize, for Into the Wilderness
 Drue Heinz Literature Prize, for Between Camelots
 GLCA New Writer's Award.

Works

Fiction
  (short stories)
  (short stories)
  (short stories)
Miss Portland. Orison Books. 2017.  (novel)
How to Mars. Tachyon Publications. 2021.  (novel)

Non-fiction
  (non-fiction guide to creativity)

Poetry 
Autogeography. Northwestern University Press. 2013.  
We Were the People Who Moved. Tebot Bach. 2015. 
Some Unimaginable Animal. Orison Books. 2019.

References

External links
"Author's website"

Living people
American male poets
American short story writers
Writers from Philadelphia
1972 births
Earlham College faculty
American male short story writers
21st-century American poets
21st-century American male writers